The 1951 All-Ireland Minor Hurling Championship was the 21st staging of the All-Ireland Minor Hurling Championship since its establishment by the Gaelic Athletic Association in 1928.

Kilkenny entered the championship as the defending champions. However, they were beaten by Galway in the All-Ireland semi-final replay.

On 2 September 1951 Cork won the championship following a 4–4 to 1–8 defeat of Galway in the All-Ireland final. This was their sixth All-Ireland title and their first in seven championship seasons.

Results

Connacht Minor Hurling Championship

Final

Leinster Minor Hurling Championship

Final

Munster Minor Hurling Championship

Final

Ulster Minor Hurling Championship

Final

All-Ireland Minor Hurling Championship

Semi-finals

Final

External links
 All-Ireland Minor Hurling Championship: Roll Of Honour

Minor
All-Ireland Minor Hurling Championship